Enclosed rhyme (or enclosing rhyme) is the rhyme scheme ABBA (that is, where the first and fourth lines, and the second and third lines rhyme).  Enclosed-rhyme quatrains are used in introverted quatrains, as in the first two stanzas of Petrarchan sonnets.

Example

''(From John Milton: "Sonnet VII")

"Exposure", by Wilfred Owen, also has a good example of enclosed rhyme. Each of the eight stanzas have the ABBA half rhyming sequence:

References

See also
Rhyme scheme

Rhyme
Rhyme